Carboxyamidotriazole is a calcium channel blocker that blocks voltage-gated and ligand-gated calcium channels and has been investigated as an anti-cancer drug in vitro.

References

Calcium channel blockers
Chlorobenzenes
Aromatic ketones
Triazoles
Carboxamides